Glaresis inducta is a species of enigmatic scarab beetle in the family Glaresidae. It is found in North America.

References

Further reading

 

scarabaeiformia
Articles created by Qbugbot
Beetles described in 1885